TA-DAA! was a Malaysian English language children's television channel owned by satellite television operator Astro, alongside its sister channel PRIMEtime, Showcase Movies, BOO, and EGG Network.

The channel started broadcasting on 15 March 2021, replacing Disney XD which ceased broadcasting on 1 January 2021 and remains as a free preview channel until 4 April 2021, when it will become a part of the Kids Pack.

TA-DAA! ceased transmission on February 1, 2023, and was replaced by the DreamWorks Channel.

Shows

Animated Programs
Polly Pocket
The Deep
Supa Strikas
Inspector Gadget
Johnny Test
Kid vs. Kat
Dr. Dimensionpants
Chuck's Choice
League of Super Evil
Dinocore
Nature Cat
Go Astro Boy Go!
Sonic the Hedgehog
Blaze and the Monster Machines
Chuggington
Sonic Underground
Spectacular Spider-Man
Fruit Ninja: Frenzy Force
Wow! Wow! Wubbzy!
Spookiz
Pac-Man and the Ghostly Adventures

Anime Series
Sailor Moon Crystal
Beyblade Series
Beyblade: Metal Fusion
Beyblade: Metal Masters
Beyblade Burst
Beyblade Burst Evolution
Beyblade Burst Turbo
Beyblade Burst Rise
Beyblade Burst Surge
Beyblade Burst QuadDrive
Yu-Gi-Oh! VRAINS
Dragon Ball Super
Marvel Anime

Live Action Series
Dino Dana
Oh My English!
Take CTRL
Senduk Swap

Movies series
BoBoiBoy Movie 2
Ejen Ali: The Movie

References

Astro Malaysia Holdings television channels
2021 establishments in Malaysia
Television channels and stations established in 2021
Television channels and stations disestablished in 2023